Cnemaspis chanardi, also known as Chan-ard's rock gecko, is a species of gecko endemic to Thailand.

References

Cnemaspis
Reptiles described in 2010
Taxa named by Kirati Kunya